Eastwood Railway Station served the village of Eastwood in the civil parish of Todmorden, West Yorkshire, England. The station opened with the line on  New Years Day 1841 and was closed on 3 December 1951 by British Railways. Retaining walls in the cliff above the site, together with a substantial road access ramp, and the remains of adjacent coal drops can still be seen. In addition, the former vehicle-size level crossing has survived in reduced form, as a pedestrian crossing.

The signal box here survived for around 20 more years until its abolition as part of the Preston area resignalling scheme in 1972. A derailment in the (now removed) goods loop next to the westbound line in October 1986 blocked the route for over a week — heavy lifting equipment had to be brought in to recover several overturned coal hopper wagons from the scene, whilst a replacement bus service ran between Todmorden and Hebden Bridge stations.

References

External links
 Eastwood station on navigable 1947 O. S. map
 Photo of Eastwood Station & Signal Box

Disused railway stations in Calderdale
Former Lancashire and Yorkshire Railway stations
Railway stations in Great Britain opened in 1841
Railway stations in Great Britain closed in 1951
Todmorden